Cheshmeh Zowraq (also known as Chashmeh-ye Dūrakh and Cheshmeh-ye Dūrakh) is a village in Kamazan-e Vosta Rural District, Zand District, Malayer County, Hamadan Province, Iran. At the 2006 census, its population was 210, in 47 families.

References 

Populated places in Malayer County